The Domestic Tyrant is a 1959 West German comedy film directed by Hans Deppe and starring Heinz Erhardt, Grethe Weiser and Peter Vogel. It is based on the play The Scoundrel by Hans Reimann and Toni Impekoven, which has been made into several films.

The film's sets were designed by the art directors Werner Achmann and Willy Schatz.

Synopsis
An overbearing owner of a coffee shop torments his family and customers, until he finds himself in court.

Cast 
Heinz Erhardt as Paul Perlacher
Grethe Weiser as Amalie Hartung
Peter Vogel as Hannes Hartung
Helga Martin as Inge Perlacher
Rudolf Platte as waiter Gottlieb
Stephan Schwartz as Alex Perlacher
Arnulf Schröder as professor
Ernst Waldow as examining magistrate Dr. Wallner
Beppo Brem as constable Rübsam
Eduard Linkers as prosecutor
Hans Leibelt as judge
Else Quecke as Trude Perlacher
Dietrich Thoms as postman
Willy Hagara as himself

Soundtrack 
Willy Hagara — "Es kann im Frühling sein" (Music by Josef Niessen, lyrics by Bruno Balz)
Willy Hagara — "Man liebt nur einmal" (Music by Josef Niessen, lyrics by Bruno Balz)

References

Bibliography 
 Hans-Michael Bock and Tim Bergfelder. The Concise Cinegraph: An Encyclopedia of German Cinema. Berghahn Books, 2009.

External links 

1959 films
1959 comedy films
German comedy films
West German films
1950s German-language films
German black-and-white films
German films based on plays
Remakes of German films
Gloria Film films
Films directed by Hans Deppe
1950s German films